Dagestan, officially the Republic of Dagestan, is a republic of Russia situated in the North Caucasus of Eastern Europe, along the Caspian Sea. It is located north of the Greater Caucasus, and is a part of the North Caucasian Federal District. The republic is the southernmost tip of Russia, sharing land borders with the countries of Azerbaijan and Georgia to the south and southwest, the Russian republics of Chechnya and Kalmykia to the west and north, and with Stavropol Krai to the northwest. Makhachkala is the republic's capital and largest city; other major cities are Derbent, Kizlyar, Izberbash, Kaspiysk, and Buynaksk.

With 14 official languages, and 12 ethnic groups each constituting more than 1% of its total population, the republic is one of Russia's most linguistically and ethnically diverse, and one of the most heterogeneous administrative divisions in the world. Most of the residents speak one of the Northeast Caucasian, or Turkic, languages; however, Russian is the primary language and the lingua franca in the republic.

Toponymy

The word Dagestan is of Turkish and Persian origin, directly translating to "Land of the Mountains". The Turkish word  means "mountain", and the Persian suffix -stan means "land".

Some areas of Dagestan were known as Lekia, Avaria and Tarki at various times.

Between 1860 and 1920, Dagestan was referred to as Dagestan Oblast, corresponding to the southeastern part of the present-day republic. The current borders were created with the establishment of the Dagestan Autonomous Soviet Socialist Republic in 1921, with the incorporation of the eastern part of Terek Oblast, which is not mountainous but includes the Terek littoral at the southern end of the Caspian Depression.

Names in its official languages
Russian – Республика Дагестан (Respublika Dagestan)
Avar – Дагъистан Республика (Daġistan Respublika)
Dargin – Дагъистан Республика (Daġistan Respublika)
Kumyk – Дагъыстан Жумгьурият (Республика) (Dağıstan Cumhuriyat / Respublika)
Lezgian – Республика Дагъустан (Respublika Daġustan)
Lak – Дагъусттаннал Республика (Daġusttannal Respublika)
Tabasaran – Дагъустан Республика (Daġustan Respublika)
Rutul – Республика Дагъустан (Respublika Daġustan)
Aghul – Республика Дагъустан (Respublika Daġustan)
Tsakhur – Республика Дагъустан (Respublika Daġustan)
Nogai – Дагыстан Республикасы (Dağıstan Respublikası)
Chechen – Дегӏестан Республика (Deġestan Respublika)
Azerbaijani – Дағыстан Республикасы (Dağıstan Respublikası)
Tat – Республикей Догъисту (Respublikei Doġistu)

Geography

The republic is situated in the North Caucasus mountains. It is the southernmost part of Russia and is bordered on its eastern side by the Caspian Sea.
Area: 
Borders:
internal: Kalmykia (N), Chechnya (W), and Stavropol Krai (NW)
international: Azerbaijan (Balakan District, Khachmaz District, Oghuz District, Qabala District, Qakh District, Qusar District, Shaki District and Zaqatala District) (S), Georgia (Kakheti) (SW)
water: Caspian Sea (E)
Highest point: Mount Bazardüzü/Bazardyuzyu: 
Maximum north–south distance: 
Maximum east–west distance:

Rivers

There are over 1,800 rivers in the republic. Major rivers include:
 Sulak River
 Samur River
 Terek River
 Avar Koisu
 Andi Koisu
 Kazi-Kumukh Koisu

Lakes

Mountains

Most of Dagestan is mountainous, with the Greater Caucasus Mountains covering the south of the republic. The southernmost point of Russia is located about seven kilometers southwest of the peak. Other important mountains are Diklosmta, Gora Addala Shukgelmezr and Gora Dyultydag. The town of Kumukh is one of the settlements on the mountains.

Natural resources
Dagestan is rich in oil, natural gas, coal, and many other minerals.

Climate
The climate is classified as a continental climate, with a significant lack of precipitation. It is among the warmest places in Russia. In the mountainous regions, it is subarctic.

Average January temperature: 
Average July temperature: 

Administrative divisions

Dagestan is divided into forty-one administrative districts (raions) and ten cities/towns. The districts are further subdivided into nineteen urban-type settlements, and 363 rural okrugs and stanitsa okrugs.

History

In the first few centuries AD, Caucasian Albania (corresponding to modern Azerbaijan and southern Dagestan) became a vassal and eventually subordinate to the Parthian Empire. With the advent of the Sassanian Empire, it became a satrapy (province) within the vast domains of the empire. In later antiquity, it was a few times fought over by the Roman Empire and the Sassanid Persians as the former sought to contest the latter's rule over the region, without success. Over the centuries, to a relatively large extent, the peoples within the Dagestan territory converted to Christianity alongside Zoroastrianism.

In the 5th century, the Sassanids gained the upper hand, and by the 6th century had constructed a strong citadel at Derbent, known from then on as the Caspian Gates, while the Huns overran the northern part of Dagestan, followed by the Caucasian Avars. During the Sassanian era, southern Dagestan became a bastion of Persian culture and civilization, with its center at Derbent. A policy of "Persianisation" can be traced over many centuries.

Islamic influence
During the Islamic conquests, the Dagestani people (region of Derbent) were the first people to become Muslims within current Russian territory, after the Arab conquest of the region in 643. In the 8th century Arabs repeatedly clashed with the Khazars. Although the local population rose against the Arabs of Derbent in 905 and 913, Islam was still adopted in urban centers, such as Samandar and Kubachi (Zerechgeran), from where it steadily penetrated into the highlands. By the 15th century, Christianity had died away, leaving a 10th-century Church of Datuna as the sole monument to its existence.

Seljuk Turks
In the second half of the 11th century, the Seljuk Turks took part of the region of Dagestan under their control.

Mongol rule

The Mongols raided the lands in 1221–1222 then conquered Derbent and the surrounding area from 1236 to 1239 during the invasions of Georgia and Durdzuketia.

Timurids
The Timurids incorporated the region into their realm following the Mongols.

Alternating Persian and Russian rule

As Mongolian authority gradually eroded, new centers of power emerged in Kaitagi and Tarki. In the early 16th century, the Persians (under the Safavids) reconsolidated their rule over the region, which would, intermittently, last till the early 19th century. In the 16th and 17th centuries, legal traditions were codified, and mountainous communities (djamaats) obtained considerable autonomy. In the 1720s, as a result of the disintegration of the Safavids and the Russo-Persian War (1722–23), the Russians briefly annexed maritime Dagestan from the Safavids. The Russians could not hold on to the interior of Dagestan, and could only be stopped in front of Baku with the help of Ottoman forces under the command of Mustafa Pasha. With a treaty signed between Russia and the Ottoman Empire in 1724, aimed at dividing the territories of Safavid Iran between them, Derbend, Baku and some other places in the region were left to Russia. Dagestan briefly came under Ottoman rule between 1578–1606.

The territories were however returned to Persia in 1735 per the Treaty of Ganja.

Between 1730 and the early course of the 1740s, following his brother's murder in Dagestan, the new Persian ruler and military genius Nader Shah led a lengthy campaign in swaths of Dagestan in order to fully conquer the region, which was met with considerable success, although eventually he was forced to withdraw due to the extremity of the weather, the outbreak of disease and heavy raids by the various ethnic groups of Dagestan, forcing him to retreat with his army. From 1747 onwards, the Persian-ruled part of Dagestan was administered through the Derbent Khanate, with its center at Derbent. The Persian expedition of 1796 resulted in the Russian capture of Derbent in 1796. However, the Russians were again forced to retreat from the entire Caucasus following internal governmental problems, allowing Persia to capture the territory again.

Russian rule consolidated
It was not until the aftermath of the Russo-Persian War (1804–1813) that Russian power over Dagestan was confirmed, and that Qajar Persia officially ceded the territory to Russia. In 1813, following Russia's victory in the war, Persia was forced to cede southern Dagestan with its principal city of Derbent, alongside other vast territories in the Caucasus to Russia, conforming with the Treaty of Gulistan. The 1828 Treaty of Turkmenchay indefinitely consolidated Russian control over Dagestan and removed Persia from the military equation.

Uprisings against imperial Russia

The Russian administration, however, disappointed and embittered the highlanders. The institution of heavy taxation, coupled with the expropriation of estates and the construction of fortresses (including Makhachkala), electrified highlanders into rising under the aegis of the Muslim Imamate of Dagestan, led by Ghazi Mohammed (1828–1832), Gamzat-bek (1832–1834) and Shamil (1834–1859). This Caucasian War raged until 1864.

Dagestan and Chechnya profited from the Russo-Turkish War (1877–1878), rising together against the Russian Empire. Chechnya rose again at various times throughout the late 19th and 20th centuries.

Soviet era
On 21 December 1917, Ingushetia, Chechnya, Dagestan and the rest of the North Caucasus declared independence from Russia and formed a single state called the "United Mountain Dwellers of the North Caucasus" (also known as the Mountainous Republic of the Northern Caucasus). The capital of the new state was moved to Temir-Khan-Shura. The first prime minister of the state was Tapa Chermoyev, a prominent Chechen statesman. The second prime minister was an Ingush statesman Vassan-Girey Dzhabagiev, who in 1917 also became the author of the constitution of the land, and in 1920 was re-elected for a third term. After the Bolshevik Revolution, Ottoman armies occupied Azerbaijan and Dagestan and the region became part of the short-lived Mountainous Republic of the Northern Caucasus. After more than three years of fighting the White Army and local nationalists, the Bolsheviks achieved victory and the Dagestan Autonomous Soviet Socialist Republic was proclaimed on 20 January 1921. As the newly created Soviet Union was consolidating control in the region, Dagestan declared itself a republic within the Russian Soviet federation but did not follow the other ASSRs in declaring sovereignty.

Post-Soviet era
On 7 August 1999, the Islamic International Peacekeeping Brigade (IIPB), an Islamist group from Chechnya led by warlords Shamil Basayev, Ibn Al-Khattab and Ramzan Akhmadov, launched a military invasion of Dagestan, in support of the Shura separatist rebels with the aim of creating an "independent Islamic State of Dagestan".

The invaders were supported by part of the local population but were driven back by the Russian military and local paramilitary groups. In response to the invasion, Russian forces subsequently reinvaded Chechnya later that year.

Dagestan has one of the highest unemployment rates in Russia.

Dagestani soldiers participated in the 2022 Russian invasion of Ukraine, many of whom were killed in action. In September, Dagestan became a center of the 2022 North Caucasian protests against mobilization.

Politics

The parliament of Dagestan is the People's Assembly, consisting of 72 deputies elected for a four-year term. The People's Assembly is the highest executive and legislative body of the republic.

The Constitution of Dagestan was adopted on 10 July 2003. According to it, the highest executive authority lies with the State Council, comprising representatives of fourteen ethnicities. The Constitutional Assembly of Dagestan appoints the members of the State Council for a term of four years. The State Council appoints the members of the Government.

The ethnicities represented in the State Council are Avars, Dargins, Kumyks, Lezgins, Laks, Azerbaijanis, Tabasarans, Russians, Chechens, Nogais, Aguls, Rutuls, Tsakhurs, and Tats.

Formerly, the Chairman of the State Council was the highest executive post in the republic, held by Magomedali Magomedovich Magomedov until 2006. On 20 February 2006, the People's Assembly passed a resolution terminating this post and disbanding the State Council. Russian president, Vladimir Putin offered the People's Assembly the candidature of Mukhu Aliyev for the newly established post of the president of the Republic of Dagestan. The People's Assembly accepted the nomination, and Mukhu Aliyev became the first president of the republic. On 20 February 2010 Aliyev was replaced by Magomedsalam Magomedov. Ramazan Abdulatipov then became the head (acting 2013–2017, following the resignation of Magomedov). On 3 October 2017, Vladimir Vasilyev was appointed as head.

Demographics
Because its mountainous terrain impedes travel and communication, Dagestan is unusually ethnically diverse and still largely tribal. It is Russia's most heterogeneous republic. Dagestan's population is rapidly growing.

Population

Life expectancy

Dagestan has the second highest life expectancy in Russia. Higher duration of life is observed only in Ingushetia.

Settlements

Vital statistics

Source: Russian Federal State Statistics Service

Ethnic groups
The people of Dagestan include a large variety of ethnicities. According to the 2021 Census, Northeast Caucasians (including Avars, Dargins, Lezgins, Laks, Tabasarans, and Chechens) make up almost 75% of the population of Dagestan. Turkic peoples, Kumyks, Azerbaijanis, and Nogais make up 21%, and Russians 3.3%. Other ethnicities (e.g. Tats, who are an Iranian people) each account for less than 0.4% of the total population.

Such groups as the Botlikh, the Andi, the Akhvakhs, the Tsez and about ten other groups were reclassified as Avars between the 1926 and 1939 censuses.

Languages

More than 30 local languages are commonly spoken, most belonging to the Nakh-Daghestanian language family. Russian became the principal lingua franca in Dagestan during the 20th century; Over 20 of Russia's 131 endangered languages as identified by UNESCO can be found in Dagestan. Most of these endangered languages have speakers in the mountainous region on the Dagestan-Georgia border.

Prior to Soviet rule, the literary lingua-franca status to some extent belonged to Classical Arabic. The northern Avar dialect of Khunzakh has also served as a lingua franca in mountainous Dagestan where Avar-related peoples lived. And throughout centuries the Kumyk language had been the lingua-franca for the bigger part of the Northern Caucasus, from Dagestan to Kabarda, until the 1930s. Kumyk also had been an official language for communication of the Russian Imperial administration with the local peoples.

The first Russian grammar written about a language from present-day Dagestan was for Kumyk. Author Timofey Makarov wrote:

Religion

According to a 2012 survey which interviewed 56,900 people, 83% of the population of Dagestan adheres to Islam, 2.4% to the Russian Orthodox Church, 2% to Caucasian folk religion and other native faiths, 1% are non-denominational Christians. In addition, 9% of the population identify as "spiritual but not religious", 2% as atheist, and 0.6% as other and no answer.

Islam

Dagestanis adherents of Islam are largely Sunni Muslims of the Shafii rites. On the Caspian coast, particularly in and around the port city of Derbent, the population (primarily made up of Azerbaijanis) is Shia. A Salafi minority is also present, which is often a target of official repression.

The appearance of Sufi mysticism in Dagestan dates back to the 14th century. The two Sufi orders that are widely spread in the North Caucasus were the Naqshbandiya and the Qadiriya. The mystic tariqas preached tolerance and coexistence between the diverse people in the region. The Communist total intolerance for any religion after the Communist Revolution of 1917 also suppressed the Sufi movements. Shaykh Said Afandi al-Chirkawi was a prominent scholar, spiritual leader, and murshid (guide) of Naqshbandi and Shadhili tariqahs in Dagestan until his death.

Since the dissolution of the Soviet Union, there has been an Islamic revival in the region. By 1996, Dagestan had 1,670 registered mosques, nine Islamic universities, 25 madrassas, 670 maktab, and it is estimated that "nearly one in five Dagestanis was involved in Islamic education", while of the 20,000 or so Russian pilgrims for the Hajj more than half were from Dagestan.

Judaism

A relatively large number of native Tati-speaking Jews – the "Mountain Jews" – were also present in these same coastal areas. However, since 1991 and the collapse of the Soviet Union, many have migrated to Israel and the United States. These were an extension of much larger Azerbaijani Jewish community across the border in the Azerbaijani districts of Quba and Shamakhi.

Christianity

The number of Christians among the non-Slavic indigenous population is very low, with estimates between 2,000 and 2,500. Most of these are Pentecostal Christians from the Lak ethnicity. The largest congregation is Osanna Evangelical Christian Church (Pentecostal) in Makhachkala, with more than 1,000 members.
 Cathedral of the Assumption is an Eastern Orthodox cathedral located in the city of Makhachkala, the main cathedral of the Diocese of Makhachkala.
 Church of the Holy Equal-to-the-Apostles Prince Vladimir is a Russian Orthodox cathedral of the Diocese of Makhachkala, located in the city of Makhachkala.

Genetics 
In 2006, a genetic study of the Dagestan populations, published in Human Biology, suggested that inhabitants of Dagestan are closely related to Anatolian Turks and Cypriot Turks. Yunusbayev et al. pointed out that these findings support the theory that indigenous groups of Dagestan can trace their roots back to ancient Anatolian farming tribes who introduced early agricultural traditions.

Notable people
List of Notable people from Dagestan

Economy
The major industries in Dagestan include oil production, engineering, chemicals, machine building, textile manufacturing, food processing and timber. Oil deposits are located in the narrow coastal region. Dagestan's natural gas production goes mostly to satisfy local needs. Agriculture is varied and includes grain-farming, viticulture and wine-making, sheep-farming, and dairying. The engineering and metalworking industries own 20% of the republic's industrial production assets and employ 25% of all industrial workers. Dagestan's hydroelectric power industry is developing rapidly. There are five power plants on the Sulak River providing hydroelectric power. It has been estimated that Dagestan's total potential hydroelectric power resources are 4.4 billion kW. Dagestan has a well-developed transportation system. Railways connect the capital Makhachkala to Moscow, Astrakhan, and the Azerbaijani capital, Baku. The Moscow-Baku highway also passes through Dagestan, and there are air links with major cities.

Conditions for economic development are favorable in Dagestan, but –  – the republic's low starting level for a successful transition to market relations, in addition to rampant corruption, has made the region highly dependent on its underground economy and the subsidies coming from the central Russian government. Corruption in Dagestan is more severe than in other regions of the former Soviet Union and is coupled with a flourishing black market and clan-based economic system.

In 2011 Rostelecom started the implementation of WDM-based equipment on the backbone network for data transmission in the Republic of Dagestan. Due to WDM introduction, the fiber-optic communication lines bandwidth increased to 2.5 Gbit/s. Rostelecom invested about 48 million rubles in the project.

Culture

Literature 
Epic-historical songs about the defeat of the armies of Persian Nadir Shah and various episodes of the nineteenth-century wars are popular among the Avars. Best-known are the ballads "Khochbar" and "Kamalil Bashir". In the second half of the nineteenth century and the beginning of the twentieth, Avar culture and literature grew significantly. Well-known Avar literary figures include the poets Aligaji of Inkho (who died 1875) and Chanka (1866–1909), the lyric poet Makhmud (1873–1919), the satirist Tsadasa Gamzat (1877–1951), and the celebrated poet Rasul Gamzatov (1923–2003). Among his poems was Zhuravli, which became a well-known Russian song.

Music 
There is a Dagestani Philharmonic Orchestra and a State Academic Dance Ensemble. Gotfrid Hasanov, who is said to be the first professional composer from Dagestan, wrote Khochbar, the first Dagestani opera, in 1945. Dagestani folk dances include a fast-paced dance called the lezginka. It derives its names from the Lezgin people; nevertheless, Azerbaijanis, Circassians, Abkhazians, Mountain Jews, Caucasian Avars, the Russian Kuban, and Terek Cossacks and many other tribes have their own versions.

Cuisine 
Khingal-bat is Dagestan's national dish of small dumplings boiled in ram's broth. Depending on the cook's ethnicity, the dumplings can be oval or round, filled with meat or cheese, and served with a garlic or sour cream sauce. Dairy products and meat constitute a large part of the diet in the mountainous regions, while in the valley zones, vegetables and grain flour are eaten in addition to fruits, edible gourds, edible herbs, and wild grasses.

Martial arts 
In recent times the region has been recognized for producing some of the world's best athletes in combat sports and produces the most MMA fighters of any region relative to population. Dagestani born Khabib Nurmagomedov was a UFC Lightweight Champion who retired undefeated.
 His training partner, Islam Makhachev, who is also Dagestani, is the current UFC lightweight champion. Dagestan has also historically produced a disproportionate number of Olympic champions in freestyle wrestling. A notable name is Abdulrashid Sadulaev. In boxing, Artur Beterbiev is a two time Olympic gold medalist, and the current (January 2023) unified IBF, WBO, and WBC light heavyweight champion, winning all of his 19 fights by knockout.

See also

 Former countries in Europe after 1815
 Insurgency in the North Caucasus
 Islamic Djamaat of Dagestan
 List of clashes in the North Caucasus
 Shariat Jamaat

Notes

Citations

General and cited references

Further reading
 Catholic Haidak in the Holy Roman Empire 
 Kaziev, Shapi. Imam Shamil. "Molodaya Gvardiya" publishers. Moscow, 2001, 2003, 2006, 2010
 Kaziev, Shapi. Akhoulgo. Caucasian War in the 19th century. The historical novel. Epoch, Publishing house: Makhachkala, 2008. 
 Kaziev, Shapi. Caucasian Highlanders. Everyday life of the Caucasian highlanders. 19th century (In the co-authorship with I.Karpeev). "Molodaya Gvardiy" publishers. Moscow, 2003. 
 Kaziev, Shapi. Crash of tyrant. Nader Shah (Крах тирана). The historical novel about Nader Shah. Epoch, Publishing house: Makhachkala, 2009.

External links

 Official governmental website of Dagestan  
 
 Dagestan in Iranica Encyclopaedia
 History of Islam in Russia
 "The North Caucasus," Russian Analytical Digest No. 22 (5 June 2007)
 BBC Country Report on Dagestan
 University of Texas maps of the Dagestan region
 Radio Free Europe discusses religious tension in Dagestan
 ISN Case Study: The North Caucasus on the Brink (August 2006)
 Articles on Dagestan, reports from research, photos
 Dagestan in Pictures 
 Daghestan's Kaitag Embroideries – and Henri Matisse?
 Dagestan Republic News Portal 

 
Avar-speaking countries and territories
Azerbaijani-speaking countries and territories
Chechen-speaking countries and territories
North Caucasian Federal District
North Caucasus
Regions of Europe with multiple official languages
Russian-speaking countries and territories
States and territories established in 1921